Eastern High School is a public high school located in the small, rural town of Pekin, Indiana. As part of the East Washington School Corporation, it was built in 1967 and has gone under a number of changes in the last 30 years.  The most recent change was in 2003 when the school built a new football stadium, added various classrooms, and built an auditorium, among a number of things.

Athletics
Eastern High School's athletic teams are the Musketeers and they compete in the Mid-Southern Conference of Indiana. The school offers a wide range of athletics including:

Baseball
Basketball (Men's and Women's)
Cheerleading
Cross Country (Men's and Women's)
Football
Golf (Men's and Women's)
Softball
Tennis (Men's and Women's)
Track (Men's and Women's)
Volleyball
Wrestling

Football
The 2015-2016 Football team went 3-8 overall (1-6 in conference play) and advanced to the sectional semifinals of the 2015-16 IHSAA Football State Tournament (Class 2A). The team lost 41–14 against North Posey High School.

See also
 List of high schools in Indiana

References

External links
 

Public high schools in Indiana
Educational institutions established in 1967
Schools in Washington County, Indiana
1967 establishments in Indiana